Elk Falls is a city in Kansas.

Elk Falls may also refer to:
Elk Falls Township, Elk County, Kansas
Elk Falls Provincial Park, in British Columbia, Canada
Elk Falls Mill, a defunct pulp and paper mill in British Columbia, Canada
Big Falls, a fall on the Elk River (North Carolina–Tennessee)